Vargahan Rural District is in the Central District of Ahar County, East Azerbaijan province, Iran. At the census of 2006, its population was 5,101 in 1,085 households; there were 4,701 inhabitants in 1,261 households at the following census of 2011; and in the most recent census of 2016, the population of the rural district was 4,296 in 1,229 households. The largest of its 42 villages was Dowshdur, with 969 people.

References 

Ahar County

Rural Districts of East Azerbaijan Province

Populated places in East Azerbaijan Province

Populated places in Ahar County